Director of CIA may refer to:

 Director of Central Intelligence
 Director of the Central Intelligence Agency